My Dear (foaled 1917 in Virginia) was an American Thoroughbred racehorse. She was regarded as the best older female racehorse in the United States in 1921.

Background
My Dear was a bay mare bred by H. Rozier Dulany of Upperville, Virginia. She was sired by King James, the 1909 retrospective American Champion Older Male Horse|. My Dear's dam was Bettie Landon making her a full sister to Admiral Cary T. Grayson's very good colt, My Own.

Racing career
At age two, My Dear raced and won in Maryland for H. Rozier Dulany but was sold to G. W. Forman in November of that year. Forman won a race with her but then sold her to trainer Fred Musante who began racing her at age three at Bowie Race Track.  The filly went on to an outstanding career, enjoying her greatest successes at Old Woodbine Race Course in Toronto, Canada where since 1941 the My Dear Stakes has been raced in her honor.

My Dear regularly competed against male horses. In 1921 she defeated her male counterparts in the Toronto Cup Handicap, the National Handicap, and the Hamilton Cup,  plus for the second straight year, she ran second in the Toronto Autumn Cup to U.S. Racing Hall of Fame inductee, Exterminator. Her performances earned her retrospective 1921 American Champion Older Female Horse honors. In 1922, My Dear did not earn a major race win but came back in 1923, winning the Toronto Autumn Cup, her second Hamilton Cup, the Ontario Jockey Club Cup, and in Maryland, the Bowie Handicap, all against male horses.

In November 1923, My Dear broke a bone in her leg that ended her racing career.

Pedigree

References

1917 racehorse births
Thoroughbred family 25
Racehorses bred in Virginia
Racehorses trained in the United States
American Champion racehorses